Abraham Hume may refer to:

Sir Abraham Hume, 1st Baronet (1703–1772), MP for Steyning 
Sir Abraham Hume, 2nd Baronet (1749–1838)
Abraham Hume (priest) (1814–1884), English priest and antiquary
Abraham Hume (cricketer) (1819–1888), English clergyman and cricketer